Stonesia is a genus of flowering plants belonging to the family Podostemaceae.

It is native to Guinea and Cameroon.

The genus name of Stonesia is in honour of Margaret Stones (1920 - 2018), an Australian botanical illustrator. 
It was first described and published in Bull. Brit. Mus. (Nat. Hist.), Bot. Vol.1 on page 59 in 1953.

Known species
According to Kew:
Stonesia fascicularis 
Stonesia ghoguei 
Stonesia gracilis 
Stonesia heterospathella 
Stonesia taylorii

References

Podostemaceae
Malpighiales genera
Plants described in 1953
Flora of Guinea
Flora of Cameroon